The skor sang na or sko chhneah is a Cambodia drum, similar in shape to the samphor but smaller, measuring 60 centimeters by 20 centimeters. The instrument is small enough to carry. Like the skor chaiyam which has a strap to allow the instrument to be carried in parades, the skor sang also has a strap. However, rather than cheerful parades, it had a more solemn purpose, playing in funeral processions and ceremonies. Used to play "Khlang Chanack" funeral music.

Equivalent to the Thailand Klong song na drum.

See also
Music of Cambodia

References

External links
Picture of skor chhneah or skor sang na drums on parade.
Picture of Thai sang na; fair use image on Thai Wikipedia.
UNESCO document, Traditional Musical Instruments of Cambodia. PDF.

Hand drums
Cambodian musical instruments